Rodrigo Otavio Soares Pacheco (born 3 November 1976) is a Brazilian politician and lawyer, serving as the President of the Federal Senate and of the National Congress of Brazil. Although born in Rondônia, he has spent his political career representing Minas Gerais, having served as senator since 2019. He previously served in the chamber of deputies from 2015 to 2019.

Personal life
Pacheco was born to Helio Cota Pacheco and Marta Maria Soares. Prior to becoming a politician Pacheco worked as a lawyer, with emphasis of criminal justice prosecution.

Political career
Pacheco voted in favor of the impeachment motion of then-president Dilma Rousseff, and he would abstain in a vote for a similar corruption investigation into Rousseff's successor Michel Temer. He voted in favor of the 2017 Brazilian labor reforms. On 22 October 2021, Pacheco announced affiliation to PSD as presidential pre-candidate to 2022 Brazilian general election.

References

|-

|-

|-

1976 births
Living people
People from Porto Velho
Pontifical Catholic University of Minas Gerais alumni
20th-century Brazilian lawyers
Democrats (Brazil) politicians
Brazilian Democratic Movement politicians
Members of the Chamber of Deputies (Brazil) from Minas Gerais
Members of the Federal Senate (Brazil)